Nergingge or Ná’erhgingá was a Qing dynasty official who was Viceroy of Zhili from 26 February 1841 - 6 October 1853, Viceroy of Huguang in 1840, and Viceroy of Shaan-Gan. He was a member of the Plain White Banner Feimo clan.

References

Manchu people
Manchu Plain White Bannermen
Grand Secretaries of the Qing dynasty
Assistant Grand Secretaries
Viceroys of Zhili
Viceroys of Shaan-Gan
Viceroys of Huguang
1784 births
1857 deaths